Protein MTO1 homolog, mitochondrial is a protein that in humans is encoded by the MTO1 gene.

References

Further reading